Rick Gotkin (born November 7, 1959) is an American ice hockey head coach and former player. He is currently the head coach of the Mercyhurst Lakers men's ice hockey team, a position he has held since 1988.

Career
Gotkin began attending SUNY-Brockport in 1978, managing to work his way onto the varsity ice hockey team in his final two years there before graduating in 1982. He spent one additional year with the program as an assistant the following season. By 1986 he was back in the college ranks as an assistant coach for Rensselaer. After two campaigns with the Engineers he received his first head coaching opportunity at Mercyhurst.

When Gotkin arrived in Erie the college's ice hockey program was only a year old. He took over after Fred Lane led the team to a very good 16-7 mark the year before and while Gotkin's first season was disappointing at 11-16-1 he soon brought the Lakers to Division III prominence with at least 18 wins in four consecutive seasons. Mercyhurst made their first postseason appearance in his third year and their first National Championship appearance by year five (the Lakers by that time having moved up to Division II). Gotkin would lead the Lakers to their first 20-win season two years later (as well as their second championship game) but wasn't able to push them any further for the rest of their time in D-II.

A year after the MAAC ice hockey conference was formed Mercyhurst was invited to join alongside Bentley and they became a Division I program for the 1999–00 season. The Lakers started off strong, finishing with a second place finish in their inaugural year, before winning the conference tournament the following season and making their first NCAA tournament appearance. Gotkin would get the Lakers to three consecutive regular season titles from 2001 thru 2003 and a second NCAA berth in '03 but after the season the MAAC conference dissolved when founding members Iona and Fairfield dropped their programs.

Fortunately for Gotkin and the rest of the programs, the remaining universities continued to support their teams and formed a new conference, Atlantic Hockey which began play in 2003–04. Gotkin and the Lakers weren't quite as successful in the second version as they were in the MAAC but he still helped the team to several 20-win seasons, a tournament title in 2005, a regular season title in 2013–14 and notched his 500th win during the 2015–16 season. Gotkin signed a 5-year extension that will keep him with the team through the 2020 season.

Head coaching record

See also
List of college men's ice hockey coaches with 400 wins

References

External links

Rick Gotkin's profile at Eliteprospects.com

1959 births
Living people
American ice hockey coaches
Mercyhurst Lakers men's ice hockey coaches
RPI Engineers men's ice hockey coaches
Sportspeople from Brooklyn
Ice hockey coaches from New York (state)
Ice hockey players from New York (state)